Manfred Mann Chapter Three Volume Two is the second and final album released by Manfred Mann Chapter Three. It was released in 1970 on Vertigo. Mann's next album, and most of his future albums, would be released under the name Manfred Mann's Earth Band.

Track listing 
Tracks written by Mike Hugg except where noted

Side one
"Lady Ace" – 7:58
"I Ain't Laughing" – 2:36
"Poor Sad Sue" – 5:54
"Jump Before You Think" – 4:52
"It's Good To Be Alive" (Manfred Mann) – 3:31

Side two
 "Happy Being Me" – 15:54
"Virginia" (Mann) – 4:52

Bonus Tracks (1999 CD re-issue)
 "I Ain't Laughing" (single mono version) – 2:32
"Happy Being Me" (single mono version) – 4:01
"Virginia" (alternate version) (Mann) – 3:32

Personnel

Manfred Mann Chapter Three
 Mike Hugg – vocals, piano, electric piano, arranger
 Manfred Mann – organ, arranger
 Steve York – electric bass, acoustic bass
 Bernie Living – alto saxophone
 Brian John Hugg – acoustic guitar (tracks 2,6), backing vocals
 Craig Collinge – drums

Additional musicians
 Dave Brooks – tenor saxophone
 Clive Stevens – soprano saxophone, tenor saxophone
 Sonny Corbett – trumpet
 David Coxhill – baritone saxophone
 Andy McCulloch - drums (track 5)

Technical
 Mike Hugg – producer
 Manfred Mann – producer
 Dave Hadfield – producer, engineer
 Derek Wadsworth – brass arrangements
 Mike Gibbs – brass arrangements
 Keith MacMillan – design, photography

References

1970 albums
Vertigo Records albums
Bronze Records albums
Polydor Records albums
Manfred Mann Chapter Three albums